The 2016 season of the astronomy TV show Star Gazers starring Dean Regas and James Albury started on January 4, 2016.

2016 season

References

External links 
  Star Gazer official website
 

Lists of Jack Horkheimer: Star Gazer episodes
2016 American television seasons